Alan Heim, ACE (born May 31, 1936) is an American film editor. He won an Academy Award for editing All That Jazz.

Biography
Heim was born in the Bronx, New York.

He has more than thirty feature-film credits to his name, and has been elected to membership in the American Cinema Editors (ACE). Heim has also served as President of the ACE organization and as President of the Motion Picture Editors Guild (MPEG), the IATSE union that represents film editors, sound mixers and post-production craftspeople.

Heim had an extended collaboration with director Bob Fosse. For his work on All That Jazz (1979), Heim received the Academy Award for Best Film Editing, the BAFTA Award for Best Editing, and the American Cinema Editors Eddie Award. All That Jazz is the fourth best-edited film of all time on a 2012 list compiled by the Motion Picture Editors Guild, and Edward Ländler wrote a summary of the editing for that listing.

Selected filmography
The Sea Gull (Lumet – 1968)
Last of the Mobile Hot Shots (Lumet – 1970)
The Twelve Chairs (Brooks – 1970)
Doc (Perry – 1971)
Godspell (Greene – 1973)
Lenny (Fosse – 1974)
The Silence (Hardy – 1975)
Network (Lumet – 1976)
Hair (Forman – 1979)
All That Jazz (Fosse – 1979)
The Fan (Bianchi – 1981)
So Fine (Bergman – 1981)
Star 80 (Fosse – 1983)
Goodbye, New York (Kollek – 1985)
Beer (Kelly – 1985)
Nobody's Child (Grant – 1986)
She's Having a Baby (Hughes – 1988)
Funny Farm (Hill – 1988)
Bloodhounds of Broadway (Brookner – 1989)
Valmont (Forman – 1989)
Quick Change (Franklin/Murray – 1990)
Billy Bathgate (Benton – 1991)
Dennis the Menace (Castle – 1993)
Copycat (Amiel – 1995)
The Mirror Has Two Faces (Streisand – 1996)
Leave It to Beaver (Cadiff – 1997)
American History X (Kaye – 1998)
Introducing Dorothy Dandridge (Coolidge – 1999)
Bless the Child (Russell – 2000)
The Adventures of Pluto Nash (Underwood – 2002)
Carolina (Gorris – 2003)
The Alamo (Hancock – 2004)
The Notebook (Cassavetes – 2004)
Alpha Dog (Cassavetes – 2006)
The Last Mimzy (Shaye – 2007)
Skip Tracer (Frears – 2008)
Forever Plaid: The Movie (Ross – 2008)
Grey Gardens (Sucsy – 2009)
My Sister's Keeper (Cassavetes – 2009)
Janie Jones (Rosenthal – 2010)
Bless Me, Ultima (Franklin – 2012)
Gods Behaving Badly (Turtletaub – 2013)
The Other Woman (Cassavetes – 2014)
I Saw the Light (Abraham – 2015)

Awards and nominations
2012 - CameraImage Special Award - Lifetime Achievement award "Editor with Unique Visual Sensitivity"
2010 - American Cinema Editors ACE Eddie award winner - "Best Edited Miniseries or Motion Picture for Television" - Grey Gardens (2009) (Shared with editor Lee Percy)
2009 - Primetime Emmy Nomination - "Outstanding Single Camera Picture Editing for a Miniseries or a Movie" -Grey Gardens (2009) (shared with editor Lee Percy)
2000 - American Cinema Editors ACE Eddie award winner - "Best Edited Motion Picture for Non-Commercial Television" - Introducing Dorothy Dandridge
2000 - Primetime Emmy Nomination - "Outstanding Single Camera Picture Editing for a Miniseries, Movie or a Special" Introducing Dorothy Dandridge 
1981 - BAFTA Award winner - "Best Editing" - All That Jazz
1980 - Academy Award winner - "Best Film Editing" - All That Jazz
1980 - American Cinema Editors ACE Eddie award winner "Best Edited Feature Film" - All That Jazz
1979 - American Cinema Editors ACE Eddie award nominee - "Best Edited Episode from a Television Mini-Series" - Holocaust TV series (shared with editors Stephen A. Rotter, and Brian Smedley-Aston)
1978 - BAFTA Award nomination - "Best Film Editing" - Network 
1978 - Primetime Emmy Winner - "Outstanding Film Editing in a Drama Series Holocaust TV series (shared with editors Stephen A. Rotter, Robert M. Reitano, Craig McKay, and Brian Smedley-Aston)
1977 - Academy Award nomination "Best Film Editing" - Network 
1977 - American Cinema Editors ACE Eddie award nominee "Best Edited Feature Film" -  Network
1973 - Primetime Emmy Nomination - "Outstanding Achievement in Film Editing for Entertainment Programming for a Special or Feature Length Program of a Series" Liza with a Z (1972)

See also
List of film director and editor collaborations

References

External links

1936 births
Living people
American Cinema Editors
American film editors
Best Editing BAFTA Award winners
Best Film Editing Academy Award winners
People from the Bronx